Ian Richard Clarkin (born February 14, 1995) is an American professional baseball pitcher in the Seattle Mariners organization. He was drafted by the New York Yankees with the 33rd overall pick in the 2013 Major League Baseball draft.

Career

New York Yankees
Clarkin was drafted by the New York Yankees 33rd overall in the 2013 MLB Draft out of James Madison High School in San Diego, California. On June 17, 2013, the Yankees signed him with a slot-money deal worth $1,650,100. He made his professional debut that season with the GCL Yankees where he pitched to a 10.80 ERA in five innings. In 2014, he played for the Charleston RiverDogs where he pitched to a 3–3 record and 3.21 ERA in 16 games (15 starts) along with playing one game for the Tampa Yankees at the end of the season. He missed the entire 2015 season due to an elbow injury. He returned in 2016 and pitched for Tampa, posting a 6–9 record, 3.31 ERA, and 1.33 WHIP in 18 games started. Clarkin began 2017 back with Tampa.

Chicago White Sox
Clarkin was traded on July 18, 2017 along with Tyler Clippard and Blake Rutherford in exchange for Todd Frazier, David Robertson, and Tommy Kahnle. Chicago assigned him to the Winston-Salem Dash and he finished the season there. In 18 games (17 starts) between Tampa and Winston-Salem, he was 4–5 with a 2.60 ERA.

The White Sox added him to their 40-man roster after the 2017 season. He pitched the majority of the 2018 season with the Double-A Birmingham Barons, making 18 appearances (10 starts) and finishing with a 4–5 record and 5.64 ERA over 68.2 innings pitched.

Chicago Cubs
After the 2018 season, the White Sox designated Clarkin for assignment, and he was claimed off waivers by the Chicago Cubs on November 20. On November 26, he was claimed back off waivers by the White Sox. The White Sox designated Clarkin for assignment again on January 8, 2019, and the Cubs claimed him on January 16. He appeared in 10 games for the Double-A Tennessee Smokies, posting a 0–0 record and 3.38 ERA before he was released on June 21, 2019.

San Diego Padres
On March 4, 2020, Clarkin signed a minor league deal with the San Diego Padres. He was released by the organization on May 27, 2020.

Team Texas
In July 2020, Clarkin signed on to play for Team Texas of the Constellation Energy League (a makeshift 4-team independent league created as a result of the COVID-19 pandemic) for the 2020 season.

Colorado Rockies
On November 24, 2020, Clarkin signed a minor league contract with the Colorado Rockies organization. He split the 2021 season between the Double-A Hartford Yard Goats and the Triple-A Albuquerque Isotopes, struggling immensely to a 3-7 record and 7.86 ERA with 32 strikeouts in 68.2 innings pitched. He elected free agency on November 7, 2021.

Seattle Mariners
On February 3, 2023, Clarkin signed a minor league contract with the Seattle Mariners organization after not playing in 2022.

References

External links

1995 births
Living people
Baseball players from San Diego
Baseball pitchers
Gulf Coast Yankees players
Charleston RiverDogs players
Tampa Yankees players
Surprise Saguaros players
Winston-Salem Dash players
Birmingham Barons players
Tennessee Smokies players